Jeon may refer to:
 Jeon (Korean surname)
 Jeon (food), a Korean pancake
 Jeon or chŏn, a subunit of various currencies of the Korean peninsula, including:
 North Korean won
 South Korean won (1945–1953)
 The former Korean won
 The former Korean yang

See also 
 Jeonju, North Jeolla Province, South Korea
 Jen (disambiguation)
 Zhen (disambiguation)